Khalifa Halima St. Fort (born 13 February 1998) is a track and field sprinter who competes internationally for Trinidad and Tobago. She competes in the 100 metres and 200 metres.

Born in the United States to Tamika St. Fort, a native of San Fernando, Trinidad and Tobago, she grew up in Miami, Florida and attended St. Thomas Aquinas High School in Fort Lauderdale. She took up track and field at the age of thirteen, joining Miramar Optimist track and field club. While at high school she struggled to improve her sprinting and her father contacted Ato Boldon, a four-time Olympic medalist for Trinidad and Tobago, for assistance. Boldon decided to coach St. Fort and after a month she improved her best from 12.3 to 11.5 seconds, making her one of the top ranked sprinters for her age group globally.

St. Fort's first international competition came at the 2015 World Youth Championships in Athletics, where the 100 m was seen as a duel between her and America's Candace Hill (who had recently broken the World youth best). St. Fort produced three personal bests at the competition, running 11.39, 11.24, then 11.19 seconds in the final to secure the silver medal behind Hill. A 100 m gold followed at the 2015 Pan American Junior Athletics Championships in the absence of Hill. Her last major outing of the year was a senior debut at the 2015 World Championships in Athletics. She was chosen as the relay alternate and competed in the heats of the 4×100 metres relay, where she broke the Trinidad and Tobago national record with a time of 42.24 seconds, anchoring a team of Kelly-Ann Baptiste, Michelle-Lee Ahye and Reyare Thomas. In the final, she was replaced by Semoy Hackett and the team improved the record further in their bronze medal-winning run. The 17-year-old St. Fort received a bronze medal as the heats runner.

Personal best

International competitions

1Was not selected to run in the final where her team won the bronze

References

External links
 
 
 



Living people
1998 births
Track and field athletes from Miami
Trinidad and Tobago female sprinters
Trinidad and Tobago female athletes
St. Fort, Khalifa
American female sprinters
World Athletics Championships athletes for Trinidad and Tobago
World Athletics Championships medalists
Athletes (track and field) at the 2016 Summer Olympics
Athletes (track and field) at the 2020 Summer Olympics
Olympic athletes of Trinidad and Tobago
Athletes (track and field) at the 2018 Commonwealth Games
Commonwealth Games competitors for Trinidad and Tobago
Competitors at the 2018 Central American and Caribbean Games
Central American and Caribbean Games silver medalists for Trinidad and Tobago
American people of Trinidad and Tobago descent
Central American and Caribbean Games medalists in athletics
Olympic female sprinters
21st-century American women
Athletes (track and field) at the 2022 Commonwealth Games